Diplacodes melanopsis is a species of dragonfly in the family Libellulidae 
known commonly as the blackfaced percher or black-faced percher. It occurs on the Australian mainland from around Brisbane to the South Australian-Victorian border.

Diplacodes melanopsis is a small dragonfly. Mature males have a black face and front of its body, and a red abdomen with black markings;
females are amber and yellow with black markings.

Gallery

References

Libellulidae
Odonata of Australia
Endemic fauna of Australia
Taxa named by René Martin
Insects described in 1901